Bazmaberd may refer to:
Nerkin Bazmaberd, Armenia
Verin Bazmaberd, Armenia